St. Anthony's Senior Secondary School is located in Udaipur, Rajasthan, India. It is affiliated by the Central Board of Secondary Education. It is one of two English medium coeducational secondary schools run by St. Anthony's Educational Society Udaipur.
The school celebrates Director's Day every year on 17 December. The school is currently headed by Mr. William D'Souza, who is the son of co-founder and director Mr. Albin D'Souza.

References

Schools in Udaipur
High schools and secondary schools in Rajasthan